AB5 may refer to:
 AB5 toxin
 Abelian category
 Analogue Bubblebath 5, an unreleased album by Electronica artist Richard David James
 AB5-type rare earth metal alloys used in nickel–metal hydride (NIMH) batteries
 SMC AB 5, a Wolf-Rayet star in the Small Magellanic Cloud
 AB-5, California Assembly Bill 5 (2019)